Stephen Hayes may refer to:

 Stephen Hayes (Irish republican) (1902–1974), member and leader of the Irish Republican Army
 Stephen Hayes (hurler) (1860–?), Irish hurler
 Stephen F. Hayes (born 1970), American senior writer at The Weekly Standard
 Stephen K. Hayes (born 1949), American martial artist and writer

See also
Steven Hayes (disambiguation)
Stephen Hay (disambiguation)